Rick Carton (born November 6, 1967) is an American artist of the Edgar & Ellen book series, and co-founder of Star Farm Productions, a children's entertainment company. He lived in Chicago, Illinois, U.S.

Carton has had a passion for art and drawing since early childhood. His art for Edgar & Ellen comprises dark sketches with apparent homages to Edgar Allan Poe. He has also provided the basis for all art used in the Edgar & Ellen cartoon shorts broadcast on NickToons Network.

Bibliography
Carton's books include:
Rare Beasts (2003), 
Tourist Trap (2004), 
Under Town (2004), 
Pet's Revenge (2006),

References

External links
 Edgar and Ellen
 Star Farm Productions
 Nicktoons

American illustrators
Living people
1950 births